

The Ikar Ai-10 Ikar is a Ukrainian two-seat ultralight cabin monoplane, designed and built by the Ikar Aero Club of Kyiv.

Design and development
First flown in 1999 the Ai-10 is a high-wing, strut-braced monoplane with a metal fuselage and fabric-covered wings. It has a fixed conventional landing gear with a tailwheel. The Ai-10 is powered by a tractor configuration Rotax 912UL, 912ULS or 914 flat-four piston engine with a three-bladed wooden propeller. The enclosed cabin has room for two seated in side-by-side configuration.

Specification (with 912ULS engine)

Incidents and accidents
June 9, 2013 near the village Friday Solnechnogorsk district, Moscow region, during a training flight fell plane Ikar Ai-10. Killed pilot and passenger.

References

Notes

Bibliography

1990s Ukrainian civil utility aircraft
Single-engined tractor aircraft
High-wing aircraft
Aircraft first flown in 1999